Little Johnny jokes are about a small boy who naively poses questions and makes statements that are very embarrassing to his "grownup" listeners (such as parents and teachers), and has a very straightforward way of thinking. At times he is well educated in the terminology of sex, while at others he is all too innocent. The jokes may also include a female counterpart, typically named Susie.

Around the world
Joke characters similar to Little Johnny are known in many countries.

 Argentina: Jaimito (diminutive of Jaime)
 Brazil and Portugal: Joãozinho (diminutive of João) or Juquinha
 Bulgaria Ivancho (in Bulgarian Иванчо, diminutive for Ivan), commonly featured with Mariyka (in Bulgarian Марийка, diminutive for Mariya) a young girl
 Croatia: "mali Ivica", "mali Perica"
 Czech Republic: Pepíček (diminutive of Pepa, itself diminutive of Josef)
 Estonia: Juku
 Finland: Pikku-Kalle
 France: Toto
 Germany: Klein Fritzchen (Little Fritzie); see German humour and East Germany jokes
Greece: Τοτός (Totos - Toto) and Αννούλα (Annoula - Annie)
 Hungary: Móricka
 Italy: Pierino
 India: Tintumon in Malayalam language
 Indonesia: Budi
 Mexico: Pepito (diminutive of "Pepe", nickname of "José" – Joseph)
 Netherlands, Flanders: Jantje, a stereotype of the average little Dutch boy, a diminutive of Jan
 Norway: Lille Ole ("Little Ole")
 Serbia: Perica
 Spain and Hispanophone Latin America: Jaimito (In Cuba, Honduras, Mexico, Dominican Republic and Ecuador, Pepito). The words jaimito and jaimitada have become common names.
 Sri Lanka: Amdan (Emden)
 Poland: Jasio (diminutive of Jan)
 Russia: Vovochka (diminutive of Vladimir)
 Romania: Bulă, Alinuța
 Slovenia: Janezek
 Senegal: Mandemba
 Turkey: Hüdaverdi

Italian Pierino
The Italian character version of Little Johnny is "Pierino" (Little Peter), the child star of numerous jokes full of double meanings. The character became very famous in Italy between the seventies and eighties, in the period of Italian zany and erotic comedy on cinema. Four movies about Pierino were made, all starring Alvaro Vitali.

Filmography
Pierino contro tutti (1981)
Pierino medico della SAUB (1981)
Pierino colpisce ancora (1982)
Pierino torna a scuola (1990)

See also
Little Erna
Little Audrey
Little Willie

References

Stock characters in jokes
Nonexistent people used in jokes
Fictional children

de:Fritzchen